Princess Hyeondeok may refer to these Goryeo consorts:

Queen Munhwa (died 1029?), second wife of Seongjong 
Queen Yongui (died after 1040), second wife of Jeongjong